Abby Earl (born 15 February 1989) is an Australian actress. She played Anna Bligh in the television drama A Place to Call Home. She was nominated for the "Most Popular New Talent" Logie Award for that role.

Filmography

References 

Australian television actresses
Living people
1989 births